Noertrange is a small town in the commune of Winseler, in north-western Luxembourg.  , the town has a population of 260.

Noertrange is home to an aerodrome.

External links

 Noertrange Airfield
Byelaws of the airfield

Towns in Luxembourg
Wiltz (canton)